Robert Grimm (16 April 1881, in Wald – 8 March 1958) was the leading Swiss Socialist politician during the first half of the 20th century.

As a leading member of the Social Democratic Party of Switzerland he opposed the First World War. Grimm was the main organiser of the  Zimmerwald Movement and the chairman of the International Socialist Commission in Bern 1915–1917. After the Grimm–Hoffmann Affair he had to resign from this function.

Grimm was the leader of the Swiss general strike in November 1918. The demands of the strike included the 48-hour working week, old-age pensions and women suffrage.

Grimm was among the founders of the 2½ International. He
held various parliamentary seats and executive functions from communal to federal level between 1909–1955. In 1946 he became President of the Swiss National Council.

External links 

 
 Robert Grimm Papers in the International Institute of Social History
 Adrian Zimmermann: Grimm, Robert, in: 1914-1918-online. International Encyclopedia of the First World War, ed. by Ute Daniel, Peter Gatrell, Oliver Janz, Heather Jones, Jennifer Keene, Alan Kramer, and Bill Nasson, issued by Freie Universität Berlin, Berlin 2017-03-23
 

1881 births
1958 deaths
People from Hinwil District
Social Democratic Party of Switzerland politicians
Members of the National Council (Switzerland)
Presidents of the National Council (Switzerland)
Members of the Executive of the Labour and Socialist International
Swiss Marxists
Swiss historians
Marxist historians
Swiss magazine founders